Gopalakrusna Pattanayaka (1784–1862) (Alternatively spelled Gopalakrishna, Pattnaik) was an Odia poet & composer of Odissi music. His Odissi songs in various traditional ragas and talas are widely sung across the state, as well as other allied traditional artforms of Odisha, such as pala. The 20th-century Odissi musician, vocalist & binākara Apanna Panigrahi, also from the poet's hometown, was well-known for his renditions of Gopalakrusna's lyrics. Some of the most iconic Odissi songs, such as Syamaku Juhara Tara Premaku Juhara Ma, Jala Ani Jai Kali Kalindasutaku, Sangini Re Rasarangini Re, Kadamba Bane Bansi Bajila Re, Uthilu Ede Begi Kahinkire, Ki Nadare Prana Sangini, Manasija Mana Mohana are creations of Gopalakrusna. Many of his songs are popular abhinaya items in Odissi dance.

Born in 1784 in a karana family of Paralakhemundi, Gopalakrusna's father Banabasi Pattanayaka was in the service of the Gajapati kings of the powerful princely state of Odisha. His mother's name was Lalita Dei. At the age of twenty, Gopalakrusna was married to a young girl by the name of Hira Dei. In the early days of his life, Gopalakrusna remained in the service of the Gajapati king as a panjia karana, an accountant-scribe. Later, after training from the virtuoso musician poet Bakrabak Chakrapani Pattanayaka, his fame as a poet and musician grew and the king subsequently offered him an exclusive position in the court to encourage his musical & literary pursuits. Kabisurjya Baladeba Ratha and Utkala Ghanta Jadumani Mahapatra were his contemporaries. Another Odissi musician, the poet Haribandhu was inspired by Gopalakrusna to write lyrics and set them to music. Haribandhu is credited with documenting a significant number of Gopalakrusna's songs, as the poet himself was not concerned with preserving his songs. Gopalakrusna would sing impromptu, overcome by divine inspiration and Haribandhu as a child would follow him, noting everything down onto a palm leaf.
Gopalakrusna's writings have been published as anthologies more than once. The first significant anthology was made by the poet's own great-grandson, Ramakrusna Pattanayaka in 1919. Before Ramakrusna's anthology, smaller collections of the poet's work had appeared in bits and pieces in Damodar Patnaik's Sangita Sagara (1889-1903) and Gobinda Ratha's Chaupadi Chandrodaya (1895). The Gajapati press in Paralakhemundi had also published small booklets of the poet's work in the early 1900s. Subsequently, larger anthologies have been collated and published by Babaji Baisnaba Charana Dasa (195-60), Kabichandra Kali Charan Patnaik (1959), Saroj Kumar Panigrahi (1969) and Dr. Krushna Charan Behera (2002).

A musical album called Lyrics of Gopalakrushna was made by the involvement of leading Odissi musicians and erstwhile chief minister Nandini Satapathy in the year 1970. Eminent Gurus such as Sangita Sudhakara Balakrushna Dash, Shyamamani Devi, Suramani Raghunath Panigrahi, Bhubaneswari Mishra and Indira Pratihari lent their voices to the various tracks.

Gopalakrusna died in 1862. His last poem is said to be a prophecy of his death :

At the poet's residence in Paralakhemundi, there is a life-size wooden statue of the poet. This statues was made in 1921 by Brundabana Chandra Patnaik, an elderly craftsman who had seen the poet during his lifetime. Some other items of his use, such as a karani stylus used by Odia scribes and his bodybuilding tools are preserved by the family.

Compositions 

Some well-known Odissi compositions of the poet are:

 Brajaku Chora Asichi
 Patha Chhadi De Mu Jibi Phula Toli
 Kananara Bitanare
 Muhamuhin Kisora Chandramankara Mora
 Karuthili Mun Nahi Nahi Re
 Bajuchhi Sahi Bajare To Naare Brajabajare
 Chhailabara Chhamure Padili
 Aja Sri Gostha Chandrama
 Banchiba Kehire
 Syama Ja Ja Juhara To Piratiki
 Bhaja Mana Brajabana Dwijarajanku
 Kaha Re Sangini Ke Se Nua Lalana
 Etharaka Syama Dosa Kara Khyama
 Anusarita Prabhu Kala Jaka Gala Sarita
 Ki Sunili Aja Νua Kari Re
 Mote Laganare Brajabidhu Lata
 Mohana Riti Chinha Padila Ma

Many of Gopalakrusna's compositions have become iconic in the voice of legendary Odissi musicians, such as :

 Mohana Madhuri Dekhithila Nari by Apanna Panigrahi
 Mane Paduchhi Re Sehi Chandramukha by Mohan Sunder Deb Goswami
 Gostha Chandrama Asibe Aja by Tarini Charan Patra
 Ki Nama Boilu Tuhi Go Lalite by Banikantha Nimai Charan Harichandan
 Brajendra Nandana Sahi Eka Sri Radhara by Banikantha Nimai Charan Harichandan
 Kanta Mora E Basanta Kalare by Banikantha Nimai Charan Harichandan
 Banchiba Kehire by Singhari Shyamasundar Kar
 Aja Sri Gostha Chandrama by Balakrushna Dash
 Kaha Chitta Taha by Balakrushna Dash
 E Ghana Dina Eka Nebe Ki Kari by Balakrushna Dash
 Galabele Mo Jiba by Balakrushna Dash
 Manasija Mana Mohana by Raghunath Panigrahi
 Ki Nadare Prana Sangini by Raghunath Panigrahi
 Syamaku Juhara Tara Premaku Juhara by Shyamamani Devi
 Syama Apabada Mote Lagithau by Shyamamani Devi
 Kadamba Bane Bansi Bajila by Bhubaneswari Mishra
 Jala Ani Jai Kali by Bhubaneswari Mishra

Lineage

References 

1784 births
1862 deaths
People from Paralakhemundi
Poets from Odisha
Odia-language poets
Odissi music composers
Indian male poets
18th-century Indian poets
19th-century Indian poets